is a male Japanese pop singer signed to the Sony Music Entertainment sub-label Ki/oon Music. He became popular on the Internet through the video sharing network Nico Nico Douga. His fans call him , a fan-made word to describe his wide vocal range that includes notes typical of both male and female voice types.

His kaomoji is "ﾋﾟωﾟｺ". As a Vocaloid producer, he uses the name Chuutoro-P.

Biography 
Piko began music as the vocalist of a band during his second year of high school, and continued activities in the music department of his college.

In 2007, while browsing the music cover section of popular internet video-sharing site Nico Nico Douga, Piko's mother encouraged him to upload his own covers and he became widely popular on this site. His Nico Nico username and stage name comes from the name of a pet dog he has.

He is good friends with another Ryouseirui on Nico Nico Douga called Sekihan. They formed a group called Akapiko Hammer (赤ピコ飯まー☆) and often make songs comedic. Piko was also friends with vocaloid producer samfree  and made a few songs with him.

His kaomoji is also his logo and the design for his hand puppet, a mouse which has been affectionately called "Pikochu". However, many people misunderstand it as a cat.

On July 22, 2009, he released his first physical single, "Thanatos" feat. Tissue Hime and later made his major debut with Ki/oon Records at a concert at Shibuya AX on March 27, 2010. Piko's major debut single "Story" was released October 13, 2010. Then, he concentrated on performing many songs of anime. His second major single, "Wasurenagusa", was released in December 2010 and was used as the Ending theme for the anime Tegami Bachi REVERSE. On March 9, 2011, his 4th major single, "Sakurane" was chosen as an ending theme for the anime Gin Tama. On August 15, 2012, his 7th major single "Make My Day" which was used as the opening track for the anime Binbougami ga!. On June 5, 2013, his 8th major single "Kotonoha , produced by  samfree   was used as the ending theme for the anime Katanagatari (Noitamina version).

Piko's first album after debut, "1PIKO", was released on May 11, 2011, and his second album, "2PIKO", was released on May 30, 2012. His third album, "Hitokoe −42701340-", an album of vocaloid songs, was released on February 20, 2013. His first Best Collection Album, "PIKOllection Best+4" was released on February 20, 2013.

Piko provided the voice for "Utatane Piko", a Vocaloid library from Sony Music Distribution which uses the Vocaloid2 engine. It was released on December 8, 2010.

Discography

Singles

Albums

DVD

References

External links
  

1988 births
Anime musicians
Japanese male pop singers
Japanese rhythm and blues singers
Ki/oon Music artists
Living people
Musicians from Kobe
Vocaloid musicians
21st-century Japanese singers
21st-century Japanese male singers
Vocaloid voice providers
Utaite